The women's 800m freestyle swimming event at the 2006 Asian Games was held on December 6, 2006 at the Hamad Aquatic Centre in Doha, Qatar. This was a timed-final event, meaning that each entrant only swam it once, with the fastest 8 entrants swimming in the finals session and the remainder swimming in the preliminary session.

Schedule
All times are Arabia Standard Time (UTC+03:00)

Records

Results

References

Results

Swimming at the 2006 Asian Games